Kenneth Lee Sokoloff (July 27, 1952 – May 21, 2007) was an American economic historian who was broadly interested in the interaction between initial factor endowments, institutions, and economic growth. In particular, he examined the influence of factor endowments on economic development in the New World and the role of 19th century United States patent law in encouraging innovation.

Career and personal life

Born in Philadelphia, Sokoloff graduated from the American School of Paris in 1970, earned his bachelor's degree from the University of Pennsylvania in 1974 and his doctorate from Harvard University in 1982 where Robert Fogel served as his advisor. He joined the faculty at the University of California, Los Angeles in 1980 where he spent the remainder of his career. He died of liver cancer in Los Angeles, California on May 21, 2007.

Kenneth grew up in Silver Spring Maryland.  He had a bone disease that was kept in submission by very expensive medications and transfusions, eventually leading to liver cancer and death.  Despite his infirmity, he had an active and full life.  His father was a famous scientist, Louis Sokoloff, who did pioneering work in brain metabolism, which led to the invention of PET scans.

Academic Work

In a series of influential papers coauthored with Stanley Engerman, Sokoloff studied the impact of countries' initial factor endowments on their later political and economic development. While much of the contemporary literature explained different growth rates across countries by appealing to differences in national culture or religion, Sokoloff  used historical data to claim that much of the differential growth experiences of the US colonies and of New World countries can be explained through differences in initial endowments of factors including human capital and levels of inequality. Moreover, Sokoloff and Engerman theorized that initial levels of wealth and political power inequality led to the development of institutions that perpetuated these inequalities, furthering their deleterious impact on long run economic growth. In the article "Institutions, Factors Endowments, and Paths of Development in the New World", Sokoloff and Engerman made the specific hypothesis about inequality in wealth, human capital, and political power that restricted development of economics: this explains how the United States and Canada have developed very differently. For example, grain grown on small family farms in the U.S. and Canada tend to lead to a more equal wealth distribution, whereas other colonies in the New World relied on slaves for their labor force, leading to very unequal distributions of wealth, human capital and political power, particularly between black (slaves) and white persons. In addition to inequality in wealth and political power, they also discussed the topic of inequality of schooling in Latin American countries. While all Latin American countries had a literacy requirement for voting, the government did not provide funds for public education. This caused Latin American countries to have low literacy levels, which in turn affected the voting rates. Therefore, a weak organizing schooling institution could affect the development of economy.

Sokoloff and his coauthors also sought to understand the relationship between economic institutions and technological innovation. In particular, Sokoloff stressed the importance of US patent institutions in fostering innovation by entrepreneurs. For instance, with Zorina Khan, Sokoloff examined the careers of 160 "great inventors" credited with significant technological discoveries during the early American industrialization. In contrast to previous findings, Sokoloff and Khan found that these inventors were active entrepreneurs who responded systematically to market incentives. On the other hand, Sokoloff, with Naomi Lamoreaux, found that over time the capital requirements associated with invention became prohibitively high, leading to firms taking over much of the innovative activity that was previously undertaken by individual entrepreneurs.

Notes

References
Creswell, Julie. Kenneth Sokoloff, 54, Economist, Is Dead. New York Times. May 24, 2007. Accessed May 1, 2008.
Engerman, Stanley and Sokoloff, Kenneth. 'Factor Endowments, Inequality, and Paths of Development Among New World Economies'. NBER Working Paper No. 9529. September 2002.
Engerman, Stanley and Sokoloff, Kenneth. 'Factor Endowments: Institutions and Differential Paths of Growth Among New World Economics: A View from Economic Historians of the United States.' NBER Historical Working Paper No. 66. November 1994.
Khan, Zorina and Sokoloff, Kenneth. ' 'Schemes of Practical Utility: Entrepreneurship and Innovation Among 'Great Inventors' in the United States, 1790–1865.' Journal of Economic History. vo. 53, no. 2, pp. 289–307. June 1993.
Lamoreaux, Naomi and Sokoloff, Kenneth. 'The Decline of the Individual Inventor: A Schumpeterian Story?'. NBER Working Paper No. 11654. September 2005.
UCLA Center for Economic History. 'Kenneth L. Sokoloff'. May 30, 2007. Accessed May 1, 2008.

External links
Kenneth Sokoloff page at UCLA

20th-century American economists
Economic historians
1952 births
2007 deaths
Deaths from liver cancer
Deaths from cancer in California
University of California, Los Angeles faculty
University of Pennsylvania alumni
Harvard University alumni